Peak FM may refer to:

 Peak FM (North Derbyshire)
 KKPK, Colorado Springs, Colorado
 CKCB-FM, Collingwood, Ontario, Canada
 CJAV-FM, Port Alberni, British Columbia, Canada
 CKPK-FM, Vancouver, British Columbia, Canada

See also
The Peak (disambiguation)